Nosoderma plicatum (formerly Phloeodes plicatus) is a beetle of the Family Zopheridae.

Zopheridae
Beetles described in 1859